The Men's 800 metres event at the 2013 European Athletics U23 Championships was held in Tampere, Finland, at Ratina Stadium on 11 and 12 July.

Medalists

Results

Final
12 July 2013 

Intermediate times:
400m: 51.75 Pierre-Ambroise Bosse 
600m: 1:18.19 Pierre-Ambroise Bosse

Heats
Qualified: First 2 in each heat (Q) and 2 best performers (q) advance to the Final

Summary

Details

Heat 1
11 July 2013 / 17:30

Intermediate times:
400m: 53.02 Soufiane El Kabbouri 
600m: 1:20.30 Andreas Lange

Heat 2
11 July 2013 / 17:38

Intermediate times:
400m: 52.40 Pierre-Ambroise Bosse 
600m: 1:20.13 Pierre-Ambroise Bosse

Heat 3
11 July 2013 / 17:46

Intermediate times:
400m: 54.75 Alejandro Estévez 
600m: 1:22.22 Alejandro Estévez

Participation
According to an unofficial count, 27 athletes from 20 countries participated in the event.

References

800 metres
800 metres at the European Athletics U23 Championships